Marolles-en-Brie is the name of two communes of France:
Marolles-en-Brie, Seine-et-Marne 
Marolles-en-Brie, Val-de-Marne